Oribe may refer to:

People

 Emilio Oribe (1893–1975), Uruguayan poet, essayist, philosopher, and doctor
 Furuta Oribe (1545–1615), originator of Oribe ware pottery
 Manuel Oribe (1792–1857), Uruguayan politician
 Oribe (hairdresser) (1956–2018), American hairdresser
 Oribe Niikawa (born 1988), Japanese footballer
 Oribe Peralta (born 1984), Mexican footballer
 Richard Oribe, Spanish Paralympic swimmer
 Risa Oribe, Japanese musician and singer professionally known as "LiSA"
 María Herminia Sabbia y Oribe (1883-1961), Uruguayan poet

Other
 Oribe ware, a pottery from Japan
 Oribe Station, a railway station in Japan